Shishman may refer to:
 Shishman dynasty, a medieval Bulgarian royal dynasty
 Shishman of Vidin, the eponymous founder of the dynasty
 Shishman (son of Michael Shishman)
 Ivan Shishman of Bulgaria